Berhampore Primary School is a state primary school in the city of Wellington, in the Wellington region of New Zealand. The school vision is "Berhampore School is Everyone's School. The school has its centenary celebration in 2015.

History
Berhampore School was opened in 1915. In 1936, New Zealand's first school road patrol was at Berhampore School. It was also Wellington's first open-plan school.

References

External links
 Official Website
 Berhampore's history revealed at last
 Berhampore School Centenary Facebook Page 

Primary schools in New Zealand